The State University of New York College at Geneseo (SUNY Geneseo, Geneseo State College or, colloquially, "Geneseo") is a public liberal arts college in Geneseo, New York. It is part of the State University of New York (SUNY) system. The college was founded in 1867 as the Wadsworth Normal and Training School before it became part of the new State University of New York system as a state liberal arts college in 1948.

Academics

Geneseo is a public liberal arts college with 48 undergraduate majors, 5 master's programs, and 25 interdisciplinary minors. The most popular majors, in descending order, are education, business, the social sciences, biology, and psychology.

The student population is 5,588, with a student/faculty ratio of 19:1 and an average class size of 25. Nearly 90% of Geneseo's full-time faculty holds a Ph.D. or other terminal degree.

Geneseo is part of the New York Space Grant Consortium, and is provided grants by NASA to support outer-space related research on-campus.

Study abroad
Nearly 40% of Geneseo's students participate in study abroad programs through the college or the SUNY system. One of Geneseo's most popular study abroad programs is its offering of the Humanities I course in Rome, Athens or New York City, and the Humanities II course in Paris, Prague, El Sauce, or at Oxford University. The most well-known program is the Mediterranean Roots Humanities I program where students travel to Greece, Italy and Spain for up to six weeks.

Administration
Following the retirement of long-time President Christopher Dahl, Denise Battles became the college's president in July 2015.

Rankings and admissions

Geneseo is among 44 "Best Buy Schools" in the 2021 edition of "The Fiske Guide to Colleges" published by former New York Times Education Editor Edward B. Fiske. The publication named 44 institutions – 20 public and 24 private – as "Best Buys," categorized as inexpensive or moderately priced with a four- or five-star academic rating. Geneseo has been named to the list for several years. In September 2016, Princeton Review named Geneseo one of the nation's best institutions for undergraduate education in its annual college guide, "The Best 381 Colleges."

Admissions
Geneseo's acceptance rate is 65% as of 2021.

Phi Beta Kappa
Geneseo has a chapter of the oldest academic honor society in the United States, Phi Beta Kappa. SUNY's four university centers already had chapters; Geneseo's establishment of a chapter is significant because it was the first (and is currently the only) of New York's thirteen state comprehensive colleges to receive the honor.

The inaugural ΦΒΚ class was inducted to Geneseo's Alpha-Gamma of New York chapter in April 2004.

Campus

SUNY Geneseo is on the Genesee Valley's eastern side. Of Geneseo's approximately 5,000 full-time residents, some 70% work at or are in some way affiliated with the college, making Geneseo a "college town."

The campus is divided between the Academic Quad, "North Side" and "South Side," with all academic buildings contained within the Academic Quad. The South Side has five residence halls and a dining hall. The South Side complex was designed by architect Edgar Tafel, one-time apprentice to Frank Lloyd Wright. Tafel also designed Brodie Hall, home of Geneseo's four Arts departments on the Academic Quad. Additionally, 44 on campus townhouses, known as Saratoga Terrace, provide a connective corridor between the South Side and the Academic Quad. The North Side has eleven residence halls, two dining halls and the Lauderdale Health Center. The Academic Quad comprising the Upper and Lower Campuses has the academic buildings, the College Union, Merritt Athletic Center, Wadsworth Auditorium and the Milne Library that has views of the Genesee valley.

The campus is laid out in generally the same shape as the state of New York; almost all residence halls are named after counties in the state, though not all are placed in line with their same geography within the state. (Example: Nassau and Suffolk Halls on South Side, which is the "Long Island" aspect to the state, but Wayne, Niagara, and Onondaga Halls which are named for counties upstate are also on the South Side.) Jones Hall is the only residence hall not named after a county.

In 2003, the college began the largest capital improvement project in the history of the SUNY system. Leslie E. Robertson Associates are the structural engineers in this project. The Center opened in the Spring of 2007. On the new building's opening, Greene Hall (a science building constructed in 1970) was shut down and completely renovated at a cost of $20 million.

One of the main attractions of SUNY Geneseo's campus is the architecture of many of the older buildings. The James B. Welles building was built in 1932 and is the oldest building on campus with arches, gables, and broad-leaf collegiate ivy draping its stone and brick facade. Formerly known as the Winfield Holcomb School, it served as the laboratory school for children in kindergarten through sixth grade. It now houses the departments of Philosophy, Political Science, Foreign Language, and English.

The James V. Sturges building, the central clock tower of the main Sturges Quad is Geneseo's signature building and contains the Alumni Carillon which chimes on the hour and plays songs at various times during the day. Constructed in 1938, it once served as the administration building and now houses the History department. Sturges also holds classrooms and laboratories as well as the Geneseo Speech and Hearing Clinic. Wadsworth Auditorium, is also one of the oldest buildings on campus.

At the far end of the South Village Residences, the college maintains the  Spencer J. Roemer Arboretum wherein are preserved "more than 70 species of trees, shrubs and wildflowers, including a magnificent group of oak trees which are more than 200 years old, and several black walnut trees estimated to be over 100 years old." The arboretum is used for teaching and recreation. It also has a gazebo and the college's memorial to four alumni who died in the September 11, 2001 attack on the World Trade Center in New York City, a gift left by the Class of 2002 through the Senior Challenge program.

East of the Academic Quad and up a slight hill is Geneseo's Main Street that complements the quaint campus with a variety of shops, restaurants, and bars. Beyond Main Street is the historic village of Geneseo, marked by Victorian architecture, well-kept mansions, fraternity and sorority houses as well as several nineteenth-century churches.

Planned expansion

The Lamron reported SUNY Geneseo plans to acquire and refurbish Doty Hall, one of its former buildings, and to demolish an underutilized structure, the Holcomb Campus School, to build an open air, artificial turf athletic stadium in 2013. Both projects are in progress, with the athletic stadium near completion.

The Lamron reported that SUNY Geneseo would acquire Doty Hall and update its electrical and plumbing systems, as well as modernizing the new workspace. SUNY Geneseo collaborated with the building's tenants, the New York State Office for People with Developmental Disabilities, who maintain their center on the building's first floor. SUNY Geneseo moved its Office of Admissions into the building as part of a new, more visible college welcome center. Then the Center for International Students, the Hearing and Speech Clinic, and the Department of Communicative Disorders and Science were all scheduled to move into Doty, but with the program curtailments and the closing of the Communicative Disorder Department, new plans are being developed for the space. These moves will free up space in Sturges Hall and Erwin Hall and reconnect a highly visible plot of land with the campus.

In addition to providing a turf field for Geneseo's soccer, field hockey, and lacrosse programs, Commencement will be held at the new stadium, eliminating the cost and hassle of annually erecting a temporary stadium in the B lot parking area.

Traditions and campus culture

Geneseo's students celebrate many longstanding traditions and campus legends.

The Bronze Bear

Just off campus, in the center of Main Street in Geneseo sits the famous Bronze Bear statue. "The Bear" also plays host to any number of spontaneous decorations and pranks throughout the academic year. A story also circulates that one of the wealthy Wadsworth daughters saw the bear fountain in a small town in Germany, fell in love with it, bought it, and sent it back to Geneseo in the early 19th century. This story is unverified, but an excerpt from a history of the family that settled the valley implies that this is not true, and that the fountain was designed and built for its current location: "[Main Street] is still dominated by a drinking fountain for horses dedicated to Mrs. Emmeline Austin Wadsworth. For some obscure reason its designer placed a short pole in its center on top of which sits a cunning little iron bear, who is generally known as 'Aunt Emmeline'". Campus legend also says that if a virgin graduates from the college, the bear will spring to life and run away, a legend that attaches itself to campus statues all over the US. In May 2016, Emmeline was toppled by a tractor trailer and was needed repair. The bear has since been returned to its proper place as of 2017.

The Painted Tree
In the Sturges quad, students from different Greek organizations sneak about late at night to paint a "Greek tree." . There are so many layers of paint on the tree that the original contours of the bark and trunk are obscured. Despite the years of paint, the tree continues to grow and produce leaves. The exact date when this practice began is unknown, but alumni report that it began sporadically during the 1950s to prevent sap from leaking and became regular practice in the mid to late 1960s to show support for fraternities and sororities on campus.  Greek organizations used to compete all night to see whose design would be on the tree come morning.

The Seuss Spruce

Also in the Sturges quad is the famous "Seuss Spruce," so called because it looks like a Dr. Seuss illustration. The tree's shape most likely developed due to damage during the March 1991 ice storm that struck western New York. Now the tree simply grows in a crooked and slightly spiral shape. It's more likely that the tree is the cultivated variety Picea Glauca 'Pendula' or a similar spruce. Adding to the Seussian quality of the tree is the fact that the bottom branches "fan out" along the ground.

Sunsets
Geneseo is known for visually striking sunsets, with students and alumni saying the sunset at Geneseo was once ranked by National Geographic Magazine as one of the top ten in the world. (Also according to legend, a couple who kisses in the Gazebo at sunset is destined to be wed.)

Ice hockey games

In recent years, the college's ice hockey games in the Ira S. Wilson Ice Arena have become major campus events that draw sell-out crowds of students and community members to support the "Ice Knights" of Geneseo. A pep band has been formed and student groups often offer promotions such as handing out noise makers to the capacity crowds.

Traditions Challenge
The student organization, the Undergraduate Alumni Association, first compiled the Traditions Challenge in 2012.  It features a bucket list of Geneseo traditions to complete before you graduate, including attend an ice hockey game, take a picture with the Knight mascot, and watch a sunset from the gazebo.

College seal and logotype

The Geneseo college seal was unveiled in July 1968. According to the college's office of publications, the seal is a representation of the college's location and mission: "The circular design features a flame from the torch of knowledge surrounded by leaves symbolic of the bucolic setting of SUNY Geneseo and its growth. Both are atop waves symbolizing the historic Genesee River."

In 1986, the college designed a logo to "provide the College with an identity mark that was more readily identifiable than the College Seal and was not meant to replace the College Seal." Again drawing on the college's unique surroundings, "the graphic underneath the word 'Geneseo' symbolizes the rolling and rural character of the surrounding Genesee Valley." The typeface used in this logo, and in many other college publications, is Galliard.

In October 2012, Geneseo unveiled a new logotype, featured in the infobox above. Bill Caren, Geneseo's Associate Vice President of Enrollment, stated the new word mark reflected "[Geneseo's] competitors' logos," which are less stylized. "If [Geneseo] wants to be perceived in the same category as its competitors," Caren added, "it would be good to have a logo that corresponds on the same level." The logotype was met with mixed responses by the student body, although its implementation throughout campus continued unhindered.

Athletics

Geneseo fields 19 varsity sports programs (7 men's 12 women's) at the NCAA Division III level.

Student organizations

Geneseo students can take part in various activities with several organizations, including The Lamron, an independent student newspaper published since 1922, Geneseo Student Television (GSTV), an award-winning Model United Nations team, a nationally competitive Federal Reserve Challenge club, WGSU, a federally-licensed radio station, five a cappella groups (Southside Boys, Exit 8, Hips & Harmony, Emmelodics, and Between the Lines), Musical Theatre Club, and Currently Known As (an improvisation group).

Greek life began at Geneseo in 1871, originally as literary societies. The college hosts several local Greek organizations along with national organizations, as is common in the SUNY schools. As of 2019, about 30% of students were active in either social or professional and service Greek organizations.

Fraternities
 National
Alpha Chi Rho ("Crows")
Sigma Alpha Mu ("Sammy")
Kappa Sigma ("Kap Sig")
Pi Kappa Phi ("Pi Kapp")
Theta Chi
 Local
Omega Beta Psi ("Omega")
Delta Kappa Tau ("DK")
Sigma Nu Chi ("Sig Nu")
Phi Sigma Xi ("Phigs")
Phi Kappa Chi ("Phi Kap")
Sigma Tau Psi ("Sig Tau")
Zeta Beta Xi ("ZBXi")
Men of Action and Change ("MAC")

Sororities
 National
Lambda Pi Upsilon, Latinas Poderosas Unidas, Inc. (LPiU, Lambda Divas) - Founded at SUNY Geneseo.
Zeta Phi Beta ("Zetas")
Sigma Kappa ("Kappa")
Sigma Delta Tau ("SDT", "SigDelts")
Delta Phi Epsilon ("DPhiE", "Deephs")
Alpha Sigma Tau ("AST")
 Local
Alpha Delta Epsilon ("ADE")
Alpha Kappa Phi ("Ago")
Alpha Omega Pi ("AOPi")
Phi Kappa Pi ("Clio")
Phi Lambda Chi ("Phi Lambs")
Sigma Gamma Phi ("Arethusa")
Sisters Making a Change ("SMAC")
Royal Lady Knights ("RLK")

Others
Alpha Kappa Psi
Alpha Phi Omega
Phi Beta Lambda
Nu Sigma Eta

Notable alumni and faculty

Alumni

Popular culture
 Glenn Gordon Caron (class of 1975), executive producer of TV series Medium and Moonlighting
 Jenna Wolfe, anchor of NBC's Weekend Today.
 Greg Fox (class of 1983), artist/writer of nationally syndicated comic strip Kyle's Bed & Breakfast.
 Calvin Culver known professionally as Casey Donovan (class of 1965), actor, writer, producer
 Daniel Barwick (class of 1990), President of Independence Community College in Independence, KS, and supporting player as himself in the Netflix docu-series Last Chance U.
 Howard Blumenthal, author; nationally syndicated columnist; creator/producer, PBS series "Where in the World Is Carmen Sandiego?"
 Qurrat Ann Kadwani, television actress, playwright and film producer
 Chelsea Noble (formerly Nancy Mueller; class of 1987), film and TV actress, sister of the Clionian sorority.
 William Sadler, actor best known for his roles in The Shawshank Redemption and Roswell
 Joe Langworth (class of 1988), Broadway actor, choreographer and director
 J.T. The Brick, Fox Sports Radio talk-show host.
 Marissa Mulder (class of 2007), cabaret artist
 Curt Smith (class of 1973), author, broadcaster and Republican speech writer for President George H. W. Bush.
 Brittany Lauda, voice actress and director for anime and video games, notable for HuniePop and Ladies versus Butlers
 CGP Grey, popular YouTube creator and web personality.
 Gregg 'Opie' Hughes, former radio broadcaster of Opie and Anthony

Sciences
 Brian L. DeMarco (class of 1996), Assistant Professor of Physics, University of Illinois at Urbana–Champaign. DeMarco's research into a new state of matter won Science magazine's distinction as one of the top ten scientific discoveries of 1999.
 My Hang V. Huynh (class of 1991) is a scientist at the Los Alamos National Laboratory who was presented an E.O. Lawrence Award in 2007 by Secretary of Energy Samuel W. Bodman for her research and development of ecologically friendly explosives which replace those made with lead and mercury. In 2007 the MacArthur Foundation awarded Huynh the "Genius Grant," otherwise called the MacArthur Fellows Program.

Government, business, law
 Liz Allen (class of 2006), former White House Deputy Communications Director
 Jeff Clarke (class of 1983), CEO of Kodak
 Amy Collins, CEO of New Shelves book publishing
 David Klein, CFO of Constellation Brands.
 Ray Kotcher, non-executive chairman and advisor to Ketchum Inc.
 Joseph D. Morelle, New York State Assembly Majority Leader, 2013–2018
 Jackie Norris (class of 1992), former Chief of Staff to First Lady Michelle Obama.
 Raymond Walter (class of 1994), New York State Assemblyman, 146th district.

Military
John Loomis Chamberlain, U.S. Army major general

Sports
 Tyler Brickler, professional ice hockey player

Faculty
 Bill Cook and Ron Herzman, Distinguished Teaching Professors of, respectively, History and English.
 Rita K. Gollin, Distinguished Professor Emerita of English.
 Walter Harding, former Distinguished Professor Emeritus of English.
 Carol Harter, Geneseo's eleventh president before assuming the presidency of UNLV from 1995 to 2006.
 Eoin McKiernan, Professor 1949–1959, early scholar of Irish Studies.
 Robert W. O'Donnell, Distinguished Teaching Professor of Biology.
 Rudy Rucker, Professor of Mathematics 1972–1978, author of mathematical science fiction novels such as White Light (set in Geneseo) and the Ware Tetralogy. He is considered a founder of the cyberpunk literary movement and developed the concept of transrealism.
 Blanche Jennings Thompson, Author
 James Willey, Distinguished Teaching Professor Emeritus of Music, composer.
 Julia Walker, former Professor of English from 1985 to 2018. Miltonist, author of several books which were groundbreaking in this field, including the 1997 Most Distinguished Essay by a Milton Scholar, awarded by the Milton Society.
 Michael Leroy Oberg, Distinguished Professor of Native American History and director of the Geneseo Center for Local and Municipal History

References

External links

 Official website
 Official Athletics website

 
Geneseo
State University of New York at Geneseo
Education in Livingston County, New York
Educational institutions established in 1871
1871 establishments in New York (state)
Liberal arts colleges in New York (state)
Public liberal arts colleges in the United States